Sawiri or SAWAIRY or es-SAWAIRI  (الصويري)  is a town (village) in the eastern part of Lebanon.

It is located in the West Bekaa District near the Syrian borders, in governorate  of Beqaa in the foothills of the eastern mountains.

Al-Masna (المصنع) is the main check point between the Lebanese & Syrian Borders and it is located in the territory of Sawiri.

History
In 1838, Eli Smith noted  it as es-Suweirah; a Sunni Muslim and Maronite village in  the Beqaa Valley.

Population 
Sawiri's population is over 20,000 people with many of its inhabitants having immigrated to the United States, Brazil, Argentina, Venezuela, Canada and France in the 1900s. The major surnames or families in Sawiri are Janbein, Amer, Berro, Balhis, El Smaily (Smaily or Smaili), Youssef, Abdel Razzak, Zeitoun, Shouman, Abou Nemry, Taleb, Shalaby, Abou Arab, Chebli, Tahan, Salha, Abdallah, Zrara, Almoghabbat and Saleh.

Schools in Sawiri 
Until the early 1990s, Sawiri had only two schools (Makased School and Sawiri Official School) educating up to Grade 9. At that time, the Sawiris used to continue their high school education in the neighbour towns of their village and then their university studies in Beirut. Sawiri nowadays has three big schools which allow the students to pass the Lebanese Brevet Examinations (Grade 9). Sawiri has one high school (up to Grade 12) which is funded by the Lebanese Ministry of Education. This high school is called: Sawiri Official High School. It started in 2003.

Agriculture in Sawiri 
Sawiri is an agriculture and service-oriented town. Most people own their land and come from a farming background. Sawiri produces lentils, figs, and Armenian cucumbers (mikthi). However, olive, Almond, nut and cherry trees have been grown rapidly as well as grape vines of all sorts in the last 3 decades. In the late 1990s, many "Sawiris" started growing peanut trees (Sterculia quadrifida) too.

Sawiri's borders 
Sawiri is very close to Anjar, Lebanon and Baalbek where ancient history can be seen in the Roman and Umayyad ruins. It is also opposite the Tell Ain el Meten, a Heavy Neolithic archaeological site that was once used by the Qaraoun culture during the deforestation of Lebanon in prehistory. Some of the flints found at the site possibly date back to the Middle Paleolithic with other evidence of pottery from the Early Bronze Age and Middle Bronze Age.

References

Bibliography

 Frauberger, Heinrich: Die Akropolis von Baalbek (Keller : Frankfurt a. M., 1892. - 14, 22 S. : überw. Ill.) (pdf 24,6 MB)

External links 
Saouiri, Localiban
Lebanon's History
Beqaa Governorate
Makassed Schools
Anjar, Lebanon
Baalbek

Populated places in Western Beqaa District
Great Rift Valley
Archaeological sites in Lebanon
Beqaa Valley
Heavy Neolithic sites